Dhruva is a 2016 Indian Telugu-language action thriller film directed by Surender Reddy and produced by Allu Aravind under his banner Geetha Arts. It features Ram Charan in the titular role, along with Aravind Swamy, Rakul Preet Singh, and Navdeep in important roles. A remake of the Tamil film Thani Oruvan (2015), it follows Dhruva, an IPS officer who wants to arrest Siddharth Abhimanyu, a wealthy scientist, who uses secret medical and illegal practices for profit.

The launch and principal photography of the film took place in February 2016; filming took place in Hyderabad and Kashmir. The film features music composed by Hiphop Tamizha, the cinematography was handled by P. S. Vinod and editing is done by Navin Nooli respectively. The film was released worldwide on 9 December 2016, after multiple postponements; it received positive reviews praising the cast performances (particularly Ram Charan and Arvind Swamy), writing,  direction, action sequences and cinematography.

Plot 
1980: A low-level party member Chengalarayudu was dedicated to his regional leader and party, to the extent that he is working for a party meeting when his wife goes into labour. Accidentally, the leader comes to the area of Chengalarayudu's house, and he lends his car to take Chengalarayudu's wife to the labour ward. The delivery happens safely inside the car.

1996: Chengalarayudu's son Venkanna secures the first rank in his 10th standard state exam, and visits the leader, who is now the chairman of the party and a member of the ruling coalition for his blessings with his father. While they are waiting in the party office for the leader to come in, they witness an accidental murder of a rebel in the party, by their own revered leader due to caste-related comments by the rebel on him. When the leader asks Chengalarayudu to take the blame by saying that he killed the man due to rage about the rebel's comments, Venkanna volunteers to take the blame and is willing to go to prison, citing the leniency of juvenile laws in exchange for an MLA seat for his father in the upcoming by-elections. The deal is accepted and Venkanna goes to prison and Chengalarayudu later becomes an MLA.

2015: Trainee IPS officers Dhruva, Gautham, Ranveer and Karan discreetly assist the police in catching a gang which kidnapped four girls. One day, Dhruva receives a cryptic text message on his phone from an anonymous number stating that he/she is aware of their discreet activities. In the evening, they go out to meet that person who is revealed to be forensic pathologist and Dhruva's girlfriend Ishika. Later that same night, they happen to witness the murder of a social activist named Ramarao with the pretense of snatch theft. Dhruva and his friend catch the gang and their leader and hand them over to the police. 4 days later, the leader of the gang arrives at the IPS headquarters with the Home minister. This political and organised crime comes as a shock to Dhruva and his friends.

Dhruva takes them to his house and shows his research on connecting all small unrelated incidents into the global view of a hidden crime network, who bend the law for their own financial benefits. He singles out three prominent business persons namely pharmaceutical mogul Dheeraj Chandra, mining mogul Jayanth Suri and gangster Irfan Ali. When he tries following one, he realizes that all three of them work as a group, and they all work for a wealthy and influential scientist Siddharth Abhimanyu. After the completion of his training, Dhruva is awarded medals for specializing in dealing with organized crime during training and also for being the best probationer of the batch, and is posted as the ASP of the Organized Crime Unit.

Dhruva discovers that Siddharth is Venkanna. After his release from prison, Venkanna had his name changed and left India to complete his education abroad. After his graduation, he returned to India and is now a well-established scientist. Siddharth uses the medical field for the wrong reasons and for his own profit. Chengalarayudu is now the incumbent Health Minister in the minority government headed by the party leader, who is now the CM of Andhra Pradesh. At that time, Angelina, a Swiss pharmaceutical company owner and activist, tries to make generic medicines for life-threatening diseases available in India at low cost affordable by poor people. Siddharth's assassin Abbas kills Angelina before she can sign the agreement document with the government and shoots Dhruva at the same time. While he is recovering from the gunshot wound in the hospital, an electronic bug (GPS + audio transmitter) is implanted during surgery. Through the bug, Siddharth listens to Dhruva's plans and continuously monitors his whereabouts and conversations via audio transmission. Dhruva receives evidence against Siddharth in the form of Akshara.

Akshara was a scientist at Siddharth's research lab, where a seaweed that can cure diabetes is found abundantly in the oceans. Siddharth tries to sell the technology and rights to extract medicine from the seaweed to multinational pharmaceutical companies but is opposed by Akshara. Siddharth hires goons and kill her. But before being killed, she records a video and stores it in an SD card so that someone will find it. But before Dhruva can find the card, Siddharth finds out and assigns Abbas to recover the card, but Dhruva tells Gautham to get the card. He successfully gets the card after a fight with Abbas, but through the bug, Siddharth knows this and kills Gautham.

Dhruva arrives back to his special house where he finds a pin that has been changed in a picture which turns out to be the picture of Naina, who was Miss World 2011 and a close acquaintance of Siddharth whose girlfriend Preethi was also part of that event. Dhruva doubts whether Siddharth himself would have come to his house. Ishika checks the fingerprints on the pin keeping the gun case Dhruva received from Siddharth in his posting ceremony, and the fingerprints match. A flashback reveals that Siddharth killed Preethi's father so that she would not participate in the competition, and as she will not have a ticket to go to her father's funeral, he offers to take her in his chartered flight and wins her over. Dhruva frantically searches for the bug, which he eventually finds and removes.

Dhruva captures Abbas and records all the information from him. He drugs Abbas and manipulates Siddharth into killing him. At the same time, Chengalarayudu reads the changed medical report, which contains very good medical contracts for public welfare and multiple accusations against the CM. When Siddharth learns about this, he asks Chengalarayudu to pretend to have a stroke and move outside to the hospital. The ruling party forces Chengalarayudu either to resign within 24 hours or he will be dismissed. Dhruva appeals to the CM that he has evidence and wants to arrest Siddharth, and he is granted permission to do so. Hence Siddarth kills his father using his goons in an accident and forces the CM to stop actions against him, or he will lie that the CM killed his father for personal vengeance. But the next day, at his father's state funeral, Dhruva arrests him on the CM's orders.

When Siddharth is arrested, Dhruva tells him that the medicine was patented in Akshara's name (despite Siddarth being the inventor) and will be made as generic medicine instead of a patent-protected one. It is also revealed that Chengalarayudu is still alive, saved by Dhruva and his gang and the public funeral held was for Gautham. Dhruva makes a deal that he would save Siddharth's life for information and evidence on all of his criminal associates and activities and gives him a bulletproof vest to fake his death during his transport to the court. They also plan to take down the setup planned by various VIPs to kill Siddharth when one of them gets close to Siddharth, Dhruva attacks him and notices that Siddharth did not wore the vest and is fatally shot by Preethi. Before dying, he tells Dhruva that he hid all the evidence in an SD card in the bulletproof vest, adding that he had not done it for the nation but because Dhruva had asked for it. Siddharth's accomplices are arrested and the film ends with Dhruva and Ishika's marriage.

Cast
                         
Ram Charan as ASP K. Dhruva IPS, Ishika's love interest
Arvind Swamy as Venkanna alias Dr. Siddharth Abhimanyu, Chengalarayudu's son
Rakul Preet Singh as Ishika, Dhruva's love interest
Navdeep as Gowtham IPS, Dhruva's friend
Posani Krishna Murali as Chengalarayudu, Sidharth's father
Sayaji Shinde as Dheeraj Chandra
Abhinaya as Scientist Akshara
Nassar as Chief Minister of Telangana
Farah Karimaee as Preethi, Sidharth's girlfriend
Ali Reza as Ranveer Singh IPS, Dhruva's friend
Randhir Gattla as Karan IPS, Dhruva's friend
Vidyullekha Raman as Ishika's friend
Himaja as Ishika's friend
Sourav Chakraborty as Abbas Ali, Irfan Ali's younger brother
Madhusudhan Rao as Irfan Ali, Abbas' elder brother
Ajay Rathnam as Subramaniam, Ishika's father
Surya as Ramaswamy 
Danielle Pires as Angelina
Hiphop Tamizha Aadhi as himself in the song "Manishi Musugulo Mrugam Neney Ra" (promotional video)

Production

Development
While, Surender Reddy, Vamshi Paidipally, Mohan Raja, the director of the original film, were supposed to helm the remake, Surender was chosen as the film's director. In an interview with, The Times of India, Surender revealed that, it took him three months to complete the script, with two months for adapting the script in Telugu, and another month for the final draft being prepared. Following the poor performance of Charan's Bruce Lee: The Fighter, Danayya stepped out of producing the venture, and subsequently Allu Aravind, bankrolled the project under the home studio Geetha Arts, collaborating with charan for the second time after Magadheera (2009). The film was tentatively titled as Rakshak, before the title Dhruva was announced. For his role in the film Ram Charan, had undergone rigorous training with an array of fitness experts. Singer Vedala Hemachandra provided voiceover for Arvind Swamy.

Casting 
Initially, Madhavan was chosen to play the role of Siddharth Abhimanyu from Thani Oruvan, however he did not accept the project. Rajasekhar was apparently chosen to do the role as well, but he missed the offer. And Arvind Swamy, was chosen to reprise his role from the original film. Sources claimed that, Arvind Swamy had charged  as remuneration. Shruti Haasan, was chosen as the female lead, reprising Nayanthara's role, collaborating with Ram Charan for the second time after Yevadu (2014), however due to schedule conflicts, she could not commit the project and was replaced by Rakul Preet Singh, as the female lead. Navdeep is apparently cast as one of Charan's cop friends which is an important role in the story. Posani Krishna Murali, was apparently cast which is considered to be an important role in the film.

The makers roped in Hiphop Tamizha, who composed for the original film, as the music composer, thus making his debut in Telugu. Aseem Mishra, who worked in Bajrangi Bhaijaan (2015), was initially chosen as the film's cinematographer, but due to his non-availability, he was replaced by P. S. Vinod. Navin Nooli, Rajeevan and Nagendra were chosen as the editor, production designer and art director respectively. The stunt sequences are choreographed by Ravi Varma. Bosco-Caesar were roped in to choreograph the song sequences, who previously worked for Charan in Orange (2010).

Filming
The film was scheduled to be launched on 16 January 2016, however, the launch was tentatively delayed to 10 February 2016. The film was launched at the office of the production house Geetha Arts on 18 February 2016, and it was announced that the regular shooting of the film would commence on 22 February 2016. However, the principal photography was commenced without Ram Charan, and it was announced that he would join the shooting from 1 March 2016. As the second schedule of the film was scheduled to be held on 10 March, Ram Charan undergone image makeover and look tests for the film, and was reported to join the sets from 14 March 2016.

On 11 May 2016, the makers planned for a shooting schedule in Kashmir, to film an important sequence and a song, and it also reported that Ram Charan may join the schedule. Later Ram Charan and Rakul Preet moved to Kashmir, for its second schedule, which was completed on 29 June, Following the second schedule, the team moved to Hyderabad, in July 2016 to shoot important sequences, and later planned to shoot the songs in August. An exclusive making video of the film was released, in which Ram Charan was performing risky stunts, all by himself, without using any body doubles.

In August 2016, the makers revealed that, the talkie portion of the film has been completed, and later planned to shoot two songs, along with the completion of post-production works. A special set for the introduction song of the film was erected on a huge scale. For the song shoot, Ram Charan reportedly got training himself under Sultan and Dangal fame bodybuilder Rakesh Udiyar. The song shoot was completed on late October. Later, Aravind Swamy completed his portions for Dhruva. The song "Pareshanura" was shot at the Krabi Islands in Thailand, which featured Ram Charan and Rakul Preet Singh. The song "Neethoney Dance" was filmed at a huge set erected at Annapurna Studios, which was choreographed by Bosco-Caesar duo. Following the song shoot, the principal photography was wrapped up on 11 November 2016.

Music 

The soundtrack album and background score was composed by Hiphop Tamizha marking their debut in Telugu. The album features five tracks written by Chandrabose and Varikkuppala Yadagiri. Bollywood singer Amit Mishra, recorded the title track of the film "Dhruva Dhruva" in his Telugu debut, which the composer stated it as a challenging one. The song was inspired from the number "Travelling Soldier" from the Pawan Kalyan-starrer Thammudu (1999), which was stated by Ram Charan, in his US tour for the promotion of the film. The makers revealed a 10-second song promo along with the track list on 1 November 2016.

Initially, the makers planned for a grand audio launch event at Hyderabad on 9 November 2016, with Pawan Kalyan as the chief guest. However, due to the announcement of the demonetisation, the said audio launch was cancelled, and the album was directly released to stores and online by Aditya Music, which acquired the audio rights, on the said before date. While the songs are newly composed, the song "Theemai Dhan Vellum" from the original film, was reused in Telugu, titled "Manushi Musugulo Mrugam Neney Ra" which was used for promotional purposes. The song was released as a bonus track on 7 December 2016 on Sony Music India.

The soundtrack album received positive reviews from critics. Behindwoods rated the album 2.75 out of 5 stating "Dhruva is an impressive album from Hip-Hop Thamizha with enjoyable and experimental compositions!" Indaglitz gave 2.75 out of 5 and stated "An album that doesn't boast of formulaic songs, this one has two actress-driven songs out of the four.  While the party-time song is a rip-off, the title track stands out for its meaningful lyrics and rendition." 123Telugu commented "Usually, star hero films bring a festive atmosphere to the fans, from the first look release to the movie audience. Needless to say, audio plays a key role in the success of the film. Predictions are too high. The mega power star Ram Charan's hero Dhruva has also had unmatched expectations on audio. Released amidst those expectations, the album differs from regular Telugu cinema-style audio. Only four songs in this audio are 'Pareshnura', 'Neethoane Dancing' and 'Dhruva'. 'Chusa Chusa' is not remarkable. Finally, in a sense .. the 'Dhruva' album is more classy, slightly different from the routine, and is an album of situations. All these songs are more impressive than the audio." Milliblog commented "Hip-hop Tamizha's Telugu debut is largely the same of what they are usually known for in Tamil." Bollywoodlife gave 2.5 out of 5 stars and commented "This album will catch everyone's interest as it marks Hip Hop Tamizha's debut in Telugu industry but it won't hold their attention for long. What didn't work was the almost repetitive composition for each of the songs. But if you are a party person and you are looking for a new part number, then Neethoney Dance is your song! For this cool, catchy song, you could give the Dhruva album a try."

Release

Theatrical
Ram Charan planned to release the film on 7 October 2016, coinciding with the Dusshera festival, but the makers postponed its release to avoid clash with Naga Chaitanya-starrer Premam (2016); later pushed its release to 25 November 2016, which clashes with the Telugu version of Sivakarthikeyan-starrer Remo (2016), however, the release was postponed. The producers claimed that the 2016 Indian banknote demonetisation, has postponed the film's release. The makers finally announced that the film will be released worldwide on 9 December 2016. The film completed, the censor formalities on 21 November 2016, and was released in more than 200 screens in United States, on 8 December 2016, which is a biggest release for a Telugu film ever. In July 2017, a Hindi dubbed version was released by M/S Mantra India Digital Creations LLP, with Ajay Devgn and Arbaaz Khan providing voiceovers for Ram Charan and Arvind Swamy respectively.

Distribution 

Marketing 
Ram Charan released the pre-look of the film on 12 August 2016, The first look of the film was released on the occasion of Independence Day, 15 August 2016. The teaser was initially supposed to be released on 5 September 2016, coinciding with Vinayaka Chathurthi. However, the teaser was released on 11 October 2016, coinciding with Dusshera. The teaser crossed 1 million views within 24 hours of its release. The making video of the film was released in October 2016. The theatrical trailer of the film was released on 25 November 2016, and crossed 5 million views within release. The pre-release event of the film was held on 4 December 2016, at Yousufguda Police Lines in Hyderabad, where the promo videos of two songs "Pareshanura" and "Neethoney Dance" was released. The promo of "Neethoney dance" featured appearances of Chiranjeevi, Allu Arjun, Allu Sirish, Akhil Akkineni, Shruti Hassan, producer Allu Arvind, directors Koratala Siva and V. V. Vinayak respectively.

Reception

Box office 
The film earned  from its premier shows in US. Within first week, the film earned  worldwide, and collected  at end of its three weeks run.

Critical response 
The Times of India, gave 4.5 out of 5 stars and stated "Dhruva promises to be an edge-of-the-seat entertainer and it delivers impeccably. You won't find yourself looking away from the screen through the two-hour-forty-minute runtime. A remake done right." Firstpost gave 3 out of 5 stating "Dhruva is an edgy action thriller tale about a smart cop (Ram Charan) pitched against an evil mastermind scientist (Arvind Swamy) and is a very well adapted remake of Thani Oruvan." Behindwoods gave 4 out of 5 and stated "With added commercial features, "Dhruva" turns out to be an intelligent and a way more superior than the original film." The Indian Express gave 3.5 out of 5 stating "This film has three stars -- its hero Ram Charan Teja, its powerful villain Arvind Swamy and its script."

123telugu gave 3.5 out of 5 and stated "Dhruva is a perfect comeback film for Charan. He should be credited for choosing a unique film like this and giving his best through a standout performance. The engaging narration, interesting twists, and some superb mind games are huge assets of this film. The film will impress every section of the audience and is bound to do exceptionally well. If you ignore the small glitches here and there, this film is a perfect action entertainer to watch out this weekend." Indiaglitz commented "'Dhruva' is a self-contained remake with excellent characterizations, arresting episodes, impressive dialogues and fine performances." Greatandhra gave the film a 3 out of 5 stating "Apart from few minor issues, the movie is right on track. Director Surender Reddy's slick direction, Aravind Swamy's terrific and menacing acting, and Ram Charan's makeover added with good cinematography make the film worth a watch." The Hindu rated "‘Dhruva’ leaves you with the feeling of having read a fast-paced, unputdownable thriller."

In contrast, Hindustan Times rated 4 out of 5 stars and commented "Ram Charan's performance is so physically and mentally fit that it scream for attention while Arvind Swamy balances his viciousness and cunning intellect equally, which is enough to destroy any protagonist. Perfect combination for the film." Deccan Chronicle gave 3.5 out of 5 stars and stated: "Dhruva's makers had a ready, proven, super-hit script in front of them which is pretty fruitful."

References

External links

Telugu remakes of Tamil films
Geetha Arts films
Fictional portrayals of the Telangana Police
Fictional portrayals of the Andhra Pradesh Police
Indian action thriller films
Films directed by Surender Reddy
Films shot in Jammu and Kashmir
Indian police films
Films shot in Hyderabad, India
2010s Telugu-language films
2016 action thriller films
2010s police films